South Carolina Highway 34 (SC 34) is a  primary state highway in the U.S. state of South Carolina. As one of the longer state highways, it traverses the state east-west from Greenwood to Dillon, connecting the cities of Newberry, Winnsboro, Camden, Bishopville and Darlington.

Route description

SC 34 begins as a hidden highway in downtown Greenwood, at the intersection of Main Street and Maxwell Avenue. At the intersection of Main Street and Ninety Six Highway, the first signage of SC 34 appears, heading east to Ninety Six.

SC 34 travels through the town of Ninety Six and near the Ninety Six National Historic Site.  Near Newberry, it takes a bypass route along Dixie Drive and Wilson Road, before continuing east to Winnsboro.  Now going southeast, it goes through Ridgeway, to Lugoff, where it overlaps with US 1/US 601 to Camden.  Continuing east and parallel to Interstate 20 (I-20), SC 34 joins with US 15 at Bishopville and skirts north of Lee State Park.  East of Lydia, SC 34 separates from US 15 and goes directly to Darlington.  Heading in a northeasterly direction now, it goes through Brownsville then east into downtown Dillon, where it ends at the intersection of Main Street and Second Avenue.

History
An original part of the South Carolina state route system, in 1922 the road ran from Darlington to Ridgeway. In 1933 the road was extended to Dillon and about 1943 a bridge over the Pee Dee river was opened. In September 1951 the road was extended to Greenwood, creating the current configuration. SC 34 was bypassed south around Newberry in 1976 and the original route through the town remained as SC 34 Business. The first part of the road to be paved was the section though Camden in 1929. Over the next several years other parts were paved until the road was fully paved by the early 1940s. During the past several decades, much of the route has been widened to four lanes.

South Carolina Highway 22

South Carolina Highway 22 (SC 22) was an original state highway that was established on a path from Ninety Six to Newberry. In 1923, it was extended northeast and then east to SC 16 (now U.S. Route 321 (US 321)) in Winnsboro. By the end of 1924, it was extended west-southwest to SC 21 in Greenwood. This extension replaced part of SC 24. By the end of 1926, it was extended to the northeast to end at SC 97 in Great Falls. In September 1951, SC 22 was decommissioned, and most of its path was redesignated as SC 34.

Greenwood alternate route

South Carolina Highway 22 Alternate (SC 22 Alt.) was an alternate route that was established around 1940. It traveled from SC 22 (now US 25 Bus./US 178 Bus.) to US 221/SC 72 in the central part of Greenwood. In 1947, it was decommissioned.

Great Falls alternate route

South Carolina Highway 22 Alternate (SC 22 Alt.) was an alternate route that was established in either 1936 or 1937. It traveled on a loop in Great Falls. In 1947, it was decommissioned and downgraded to secondary roads.

South Carolina Highway 73

In May 1936, its western terminus was extended to SC 38 in Brownsville. In 1939, it was decommissioned and redesignated as part of SC 34.

Major intersections

Special routes

Newberry business loop

South Carolina Highway 34 Business (SC 34 Bus.) was established in 1976, following the old mainline route through downtown Newberry, via Boundary Street, College Street, and Main Street. In 2005 the route was decommissioned.

Newberry connector

South Carolina Highway 34 Connector (SC 34 Conn.) is an unsigned connector route southwest of downtown Newberry.

Ridgeway truck route

South Carolina Highway 34 Truck (SC 34 Truck) is a  truck route in the town of Ridgeway. It utilizes Thomas Street and part of U.S. Route 21 (US 21) to bypass part of the town. It begins at an intersection with the SC 34 mainline (Dogwood Drive in the northwestern part of the town. It takes Thomas Street to the northeast. Immediately, it crosses some railroad tracks of Norfolk Southern Railway. A short distance later, it intersects US 21. Here, it turns right and follows that highway to the southeast. The two highways travel through a residential area and then intersect the SC 34 mainline again.

Camden truck route

South Carolina Highway 34 Truck (SC 34 Truck) is a  truck route of SC 34 that exists entirely within the southern part of Camden. It uses York Street and Mill Street to connect U.S. Route 521 (US 521; Broad Street) with US 1/SC 34 (East Dekalb Street). It is entirely concurrent with US 521 Truck. The southbound lanes are also part of US 1 Truck, with no indication of US 1 Truck or SC 34 Truck; the northbound lanes have no indication of US 521 Truck.

Darlington truck route

South Carolina Highway 34 Truck (SC 34 Truck) is a  truck route that is partially within the city limits of Darlington, which is in the southeastern part of Darlington County. It has concurrencies with U.S. Route 52 and US 401.

The truck route begins at the northern end of the exit ramp from SC 34/SC 151 (Harry Byrd Highway) to US 52/US 401 (Governor Williams Highway). This interchange is just east of Darlington Raceway. This ramp heads to the south-southeast and crosses over Indian Creek before merging into US 52/US 401. The three highways travel to the southeast and have an intersection with Lamar Highway. At this intersection, US 401 splits off to the southwest, while US 52 and SC 34 Truck continue to the southeast. This intersection is also the western terminus of SC 34 Connector (SC 34 Conn.), which takes Lamar Highway to the northeast. They begin a curve to the east-southeast and pass Brockington Elementary School. They have an intersection with SC 340 (known as Timmonsville Highway south of this intersection and Washington Street north of it). They travel through rural areas of the southern part of the city. Then they temporarily leave the city limits of the city and cross over some railroad tracks of the Carolina Piedmont Railroad and Limit Street.

During the brief re-entering of Darlington, they intersect US 52 Bus. (South Main Street north). At this intersection, US 52 turns right and takes South Main Street tot the south-southeast, while SC 34 Truck continues to the east-southeast. The highway leaves Darlington and curves to the east. It crosses over some railroad tracks of South Carolina Central Railroad (SCRF) and then curves to the southeast. It crosses over the SCRF rail line again before intersecting South Charleston Road. Here, SC 34 Truck turns left and travels to the north-northwest. It curves to the north-northeast and crosses over Black Creek on the Williamson's Bridge. It travels through Howards Crossroads and then crosses over Back Swamp. After crossing over Alligator Creek, it curves to the north-northwest and enters Mechanicsville. Here, the truck route reaches its eastern terminus, an intersection with SC 34. Here, the roadway continues as North Charleston Road.

Darlington connector

SC 34 Connector (SC 34 Conn.) is a  connector route southwest of downtown Darlington. The highway is named Lamar Highway and connects U.S. Route 401 (US 401), at its intersection with US 52, with SC 34/SC 151. Though it is not signed with a typical auxiliary signage plate and SC 34 shield, green highway signs at both ends denote the road as the "34–401 Connector."

It begins at an intersection with US 52, US 401, and SC 34 Truck in the extreme southwestern part of Darlington, which is in the southeastern part of Darlington County. It travels to the northeast. An intersection with Hart Street provides access to SC 34 west and SC 151. The highway continues to the northeast until it reaches its eastern terminus, an intersection with SC 34 and SC 151.

See also

References

External links

 
 Mapmikey's South Carolina Highways Page: SC 30-39

034
Transportation in Greenwood County, South Carolina
Transportation in Newberry County, South Carolina
Transportation in Fairfield County, South Carolina
Transportation in Kershaw County, South Carolina
Transportation in Lee County, South Carolina
Transportation in Darlington County, South Carolina
Transportation in Marlboro County, South Carolina
Transportation in Dillon County, South Carolina